Arthur Dubois ( – October 23, 2022) was an American hip-hop artist and music producer from Chicago.

Musical career 
Dubois specialized in making trap music. He began teaching himself how to make music as a hobby in 2013, when we was 66 years old.

Personal life and death 
Dubois was the father of two children and also a grandfather. He died on October 23, 2022.

References

External links 
 Beats By Arthur Dubois - interview with NPR

1940s births
Year of birth missing
2022 deaths
American hip hop musicians
American hip hop record producers